Jack Eyers (born 1989) is a British paracanoeist who competes at international canoe competitions. He is a two-time World champion and a European champion. He is an above-the-knee leg amputee.

Modelling
Eyers was crowned Mr. England in 2017 and was the first amputee to do so. He also began his modelling career with Models of Diversity, an agency that targets to expand body diversity in the fashion industry.

References

1989 births
Living people
Sportspeople from Bournemouth
Paracanoeists of Great Britain
English male canoeists
English male models